Saath Saath Banayenge Ek Aashiyaan (international title: East Meets West) is a Hindi television serial that aired on Zee TV starting from 10 March 2008 until 6 November 2008, based on the concept of how culture impacts on an individual's life.

Plot
The story is based on the lives of two grandsons of a Punjabi family (the Singh's) from Delhi, who marry girls who are culturally and geographically poles apart from each other. One hails from a small town in Punjab while the other is an NRI who has been brought up across the seven seas. The story takes many turns, romantic, emotional, dramatic and purely funny when the two girls start living under the same roof.

Abhay is the son of Ranveer (the eldest son of Mr. and Mrs. Singh, manipulative and coldhearted) and Rama (humble and respectful of her elders, fears her husband), he returns home for his grandparents' anniversary, after being in the US. His father makes a surprise announcement that, Abhay will marry his friend's daughter, Lajwanti (Lamita). However, Abhay has already fallen in love with his then girlfriend and now wife, Lisa. Abhay and Lisa eventually marry, causing Abhay to be disowned by his own father.

Uday is the son of Ranjeet (the youngest son of Mr. and Mrs. Singh, Ranveer's brother. Often disrespected by his wife and brother) and Rekha (malicious and takes pleasure in destroying the happiness of her family), he decides to marry Lajwanti (Lamita) at Rekha's dismay, to bring peace in the family. With so many failed attempts to stop the wedding, Uday and Lajwanti (Lamita) get married after her father undergoes a heart attack. Rekha refuses to accept Lajwanti (Lamita) as Uday's wife, unless Ranveer accepts Lisa. Ranveer reluctantly brings Abhay and Lisa home to Rekha's surprise.

The two daughters-in-law are given a warm welcome in the Singh Family. Rekha vows to get rid of Lajwanti (Lamita) and Ranveer has the same motives with Lisa. Rekha and Ranveer go head to head trying to stop each other from each of their motives.

Lisa (a very beautiful, intelligent, modern girl, respectful, yet sassy) and Lajwanti [Lamita] (illiterate, cultured village girl, humble and respectful) are two different girls, who develop a very powerful, strong and unbreakable bond much to Ranveer and Rekha's surprise and dismay. Rekha tries to break Lisa and Lajwanti's relationship, but to no avail. Lisa becomes aware of Rekha's plans to get rid of Lajwanti and does everything to stop her. Rekha then decides to get rid of Lisa by bringing Lisa's old friend Vikrant to live with them. Vikrant causes many problems in Lisa's marriage, the final straw was when Vikrant at Rekha's orders made Lisa sign Uma (Abhay's little sister)'s abortion papers as hers, with Vikrant as the father. Lisa is thrown out of the house.

With Lisa gone, Lajwanti faces many difficulties alone. Rekha causes many problems for her as well, including getting her (Rekha) sister Jax to poison Ranveer and Lajwanti is falsely accused. Lajwanti too is thrown out of the house.

With help of a woman named Saraswati, Lisa and Lajwanti fight for their place in the Singh family. With so many failed attempts to expose Rekha, Lisa manages to gather enough evidence against Aunt Rekha. The truth eventually comes to light during Puja ceremony, after Lisa took a gunshot ordered by Rekha for Lajwanti. Rekha is arrested and Ranveer finally accepts Lisa.

Cast 
 Reema Vohra as Lamita Uday Singh (Uday's wife)
 Gagan Malik as Uday Singh
 Tulika Upadhyay as Lisa Abhay Singh
 Amit Tandon / Salil Acharya as Abhay Singh
 Sunil Rege as Mr. Singh 
 Renuka Israni as Mrs. Singh 
 Nimai Bali as Ranveer Singh (Abhay's father) 
 Anita Kulkarni as Rama Ranveer Singh (Abhay's mother)
 Shikha Chitambare as Uma Rowan Singh (Abhay's sister)
 Hemant Choudhary as Ranjeet Singh (Uday's father)
 Supriya Karnik as Rekha Ranjeet Singh (Uday's mother)
 Puneet Panjwani as Vinay Singh (Uday's brother)
 Sharmilee Raj as Anjana Vinay Singh (Uday's sister-in-law)
 Shivani Thakur as Ruchi Singh (Uday's sister)
 Narendra Gupta as Banwari
 Anup Upadhyay
 Priya Dixit
 Sunny Gill
 Arup Pal

References

External links
 

Indian television soap operas
Zee TV original programming
2008 Indian television series debuts
2008 Indian television series endings